Mari Hamada Live Tour 2012 "Legenda" is a live video by Japanese singer/songwriter Mari Hamada, released on December 5, 2012 by Meldac/Tokuma Japan on DVD. The video was recorded live on May 26, 2012 at the Nakano Sun Plaza as the final show of Hamada's Legenda tour.

The video peaked at No. 12 on Oricon's DVD chart.

Track listing

Personnel 
 Takashi Masuzaki (Dimension) – guitar
 Yōichi Fujii – guitar
 Tomonori "You" Yamada – bass
 Satoshi "Joe" Miyawaki – drums
 Takanobu Masuda – keyboards
 Masafumi Nakao – keyboards, sound effects
 ERI (Eri Hamada) – backing vocals

Charts

References

External links 
  (Mari Hamada)
 Official website (Tokuma Japan)
 

2012 live albums
2012 video albums
Japanese-language live albums
Live video albums
Mari Hamada video albums
Tokuma Shoten albums
Albums recorded at Nakano Sun Plaza